Xerocrassa cardonae is a species of air-breathing land snail, a pulmonate gastropod mollusk in the family Geometridae.

Distribution

This species is endemic to the island of Menorca in Spain.

References

 Bank, R. A.; Neubert, E. (2017). Checklist of the land and freshwater Gastropoda of Europe. Last update: July 16th, 201

External links

  Hidalgo, J. G. (1867). Diagnose d'une espèce nouvelle d'Helix. Journal de Conchyliologie. 15: 209-210, pl. 12

cardonae
Molluscs of Europe
Endemic fauna of the Balearic Islands
Gastropods described in 1867